Denis O'Donovan (born 23 July 1955) is an Irish Fianna Fáil politician who served as a Senator for the Agricultural Panel since April 2011. He previously served as Cathaoirleach of Seanad Éireann from 2016 to 2020 and Leas-Chathaoirleach of Seanad Éireann from 2011 to 2016. He served as a Teachta Dála (TD) for the Cork South-West constituency from 2002 to 2007.

A native of Bantry, County Cork, he was elected to Cork County Council in 1985, and re-elected in 1991 and 1999. He was nominated by the Taoiseach to the Seanad in 1989. He was an unsuccessful candidate at the 1993 Seanad election but was elected to the Seanad in 1997 as a Senator for the Industrial and Commercial Panel. O'Donovan was elected to Dáil Éireann, on his fifth attempt, at the 2002 general election for the Cork South-West constituency. He lost his Dáil seat at the 2007 general election, however, he was subsequently elected to the Seanad.

O'Donovan was the Chairman of the all-party Oireachtas Committee on the Constitution, established in December 2002 to review the Constitution. He has a degree in law from University College Cork and is a qualified solicitor.

In June 2010, he lost the Fianna Fáil parliamentary party whip when he failed to support the government on the Dog Breeding Establishment bill. He was a Fianna Fáil candidate at the 2011 general election for Cork South-West but was not elected. He was re-elected to the Seanad in April 2011. He was Leas-Chathaoirleach (Deputy Chairman) of the 24th Seanad. He was re-elected again to Seanad Éireann on the Agricultural Panel in April 2016 and again in April 2020.

He served as Cathaoirleach of Seanad Éireann from 8 June 2016 until 29 June 2020.

References

External links
Denis O'Donovan's page on the Fianna Fáil website

 

1955 births
Alumni of University College Cork
Cathaoirligh of Seanad Éireann
Fianna Fáil TDs
Irish solicitors
Living people
Local councillors in County Cork
Members of the 19th Seanad
Members of the 21st Seanad
Members of the 23rd Seanad
Members of the 24th Seanad
Members of the 25th Seanad
Members of the 26th Seanad
Members of the 29th Dáil
People from Bantry
Politicians from County Cork
Nominated members of Seanad Éireann
Fianna Fáil senators